Li-Ron Choir (Hebrew: מקהלת לי-רון) is an Israeli award-winning choir. Its repertoire includes classical music, folk songs, Jewish and Israeli music.

History
Li-Ron Choir was established in 1980 at the Gordon School in Herzliya by Ronit Shapira. The choir represents Herzliya both locally and abroad. The choir is composed of three groups: children between the ages of 6-11, teenagers from 12-18 and a vocal ensemble.

Participation in the choir has several goals: developing listening skills, honing the ability to process musical content and promoting tolerance and empathy.

Many Israeli composers, among them Sara Shoham, Andre Hajdu, Menachem Wiesenberg, Ovadia Tuvia, Moshe Rasiuk, Mary Even-or and Moshe Zorman, have written special choral works for the choir. Li-Ron performed the Yiddish song Oyf 'n Pripetshok for the sound track of Schindler's List.

International competitions
Since 1991 the choir had participated in several international competitions:
 1991 - Wales, England – gold medal
 1995 - Budapest, Hungary – gold medal, 1st prize
 1996 - Netanya, Israel – gold medal, 1st prize
 1997 - Giessen, Germany – gold medal
 1998 - Salsemaggiore, Italy – gold medal, 1st prize
 2000 - Grado, Italy – two gold medals
 2002 - Tolosa, Spain – 1st prize
 2003 - Wales, England - third prize in vocal groups competition
 2004 - Bremen, Germany ("Choir Olympics") - two gold medals
 2006 - Xiamen, China ("Choir Olympics") – gold medal and a 1st prize
 2008 - Graz, Austria ("Choir Olympics") – gold medal and the "World Champions" title
 2009 - Bratislava, Slovakia – three gold medals 
 2011 - Wernigerode, Germany - three gold medals

Discography
Schindler's List - Original Motion Picture Soundtrack (1994) 
A Prayer for Peace - In Memory of Yitzhak Rabin (1996)
The Choir’s Repertoire (1996)
Smoke and Ashes (1998)
Berale Come Out (2000)
The Choir’s Repertoire (2002)
The Little Prince (2003)
Memorial Concert Commemorating the 60th Anniversary of the Holocaust of Hungarian Jewry (2005)
Wind & Sand (2006)
2010 (2011)
Children's Songs (2012)

See also
Music of Israel

References

External links
Official website

Musical groups established in 1980
Israeli choirs
Choirs of children
1980 establishments in Israel